JapanPopShow is the second album of Brazilian singer/drummer Curumin. It was co-produced by Curumin, Gustavo Lenza and Lucas Martins in 2008 and released originally by YB Music in Brazil. Quannum Projects released the album in the United States.

Track listing
 Salto no Vácuo com Joelhada
 Dançando no Escuro
 Compacto
 Magrela Fever
 Kyoto
 JapanPopShow
 Misterio Stereo
 Saida Bangú
 Mal Estar Card
 Caixa Preta
 Sambito (Totaru Shock)
 Esperança
 Fumanchú

Release history

References

Curumin albums
2008 albums